Nico Vivarelli is a Grand Prix motorcycle racer from Italy.

Career statistics

By season

Races by year
(key)

References

External links
 Profile on motogp.com

Italian motorcycle racers
1986 births
Living people
125cc World Championship riders
FIM Superstock 1000 Cup riders
People from Grosseto
Sportspeople from the Province of Grosseto